Baudreix is a commune of the Pyrénées-Atlantiques department in southwestern France.

It is located about 14 km southeast of Pau, on the Gave de Pau river.

See also
Communes of the Pyrénées-Atlantiques department

References

Communes of Pyrénées-Atlantiques